In plane geometry, a lune is the concave-convex region bounded by two circular arcs. It has one boundary portion for which the connecting segment of any two nearby points moves outside the region and another boundary portion for which the connecting segment of any two nearby points lies entirely inside the region. A convex-convex region is termed a lens.

Formally, a lune is the relative complement of one disk in another (where they intersect but neither is a subset of the other).

Squaring the lune 

In the 5th century BC, Hippocrates of Chios showed that the Lune of Hippocrates and two other lunes could be exactly squared (converted into a square having the same area) by straightedge and compass. In 1766 the Finnish mathematician Daniel Wijnquist, quoting Daniel Bernoulli, listed all five geometrical squareable lunes, adding to those known by Hippocrates. In 1771 Leonard Euler gave a general approach and obtained certain equation to the problem. In 1933 and 1947 it was proven by Nikolai Chebotaryov and his student Anatoly Dorodnov that these five are the only squarable lunes.

Area 

The area of a lune formed by circles of radii a and b (b>a) with distance c between their centers is

where  is the inverse function of the secant function, and where 

is the area of a triangle with sides a, b and c.

See also 
 Arbelos
 Crescent
 Gauss–Bonnet theorem
 Lens

References

External links 
 The Five Squarable Lunes at MathPages

Piecewise-circular curves